Cephalorrhynchus is a genus of flowering plants in the dandelion family.

Description
Biennial or perennial daisy-like herbaceous plants with erect stem. Leaves are alternate, oval or oblong, undivided or pinnate. Roots thicken in tuberous form.

Corymbose-paniculate inflorescences with heads that have clusters of 10 to 15 bisexual ligulate flowers. The involucre is cylindrical two to four rowed, with the inner involucral bracts twice as long as outer bracts. The receptacle is flat and glabrous. The corolla is yellow, whitish yellow or azure blue. The stamens have saggitate anthers and ovate appendage. Achenes fusiform, transversely rugose, with five broad, rounded ribs. Pappus white.

Species
 accepted species
 Cephalorrhynchus chitralensis Tuisl - Afghanistan, Pakistan
 Cephalorrhynchus kossinskyi (Krasch.) Kirp. - Turkmenistan, Iran
 Cephalorrhynchus longifoli (Mill.) Druce. -  Iran
 Cephalorrhynchus subplumosus Kovalevsk. - Kazakhstan, Kyrgyzstan, Uzbekistan

 formerly included
several species formerly regarded as members of Cephalorrhynchus have been transferred to Lactuca in the past few years.

References

External links
 Asteraceae
 Flora of Iran
 Images - Flora of Israel

Asteraceae genera
Cichorieae